François Ayoub (born on 11 July 1899 in Aleppo, Syria - died on 2 June 1966) was a Syrian Archbishop of the Maronite Catholic Archeparchy of Aleppo and the Maronite Catholic Archeparchy of Cyprus.

Life
On 16 May 1925, Françoise Ayoub was ordained a priest. His appointment as Archbishop of the Maronite Catholic Archeparchy of Cyprus took place on 28 November 1942 and he was consecrated bishop on 14 February 1943 by Maronite Patriarch of Antioch Anthony Peter Arida, and his co-consecrators were Abdallah Khoury, Titular bishop of Arca in Phoenicia dei Maroniti, Elie Rischa, Eparch of Baalbek, Elie Chedid, Titular Archbishop of Cyrruhs per i Maroniti, Michael Akras, Archeparch of Aleppo and Jean Elie El-Hage, Archeparch of Damascus. In 1950, he was co-consecrator of the Maronite Patriarch of Antioch Anthony Peter Khoraish. On 16 April 1954, Ayoub was named to the Archeparchy of Aleppo and at the same time he was appointed Apostolic Administrator of the Maronite Catholic Eparchy of Latakia. He participated in the four sessions of the Second Vatican Council (1962-1965).

References

External links
 http://www.catholic-hierarchy.org/bishop/bayoub.html
 https://web.archive.org/web/20170702013321/http://www.apostolische-nachfolge.de/asien2.htm

1899 births
1966 deaths
20th-century Maronite Catholic bishops
Syrian Maronites
Place of death missing
People from Aleppo
Participants in the Second Vatican Council